Robert Kennedy (20 January 1916 – 28 May 2004) was a British athlete. He competed in the men's high jump at the 1936 Summer Olympics.

References

1916 births
2004 deaths
Athletes (track and field) at the 1936 Summer Olympics
British male high jumpers
Olympic athletes of Great Britain
Place of birth missing